Lusitanops is a genus of sea snails, marine gastropod mollusks in the family Raphitomidae.

Description
This genus is characterized by a reticulated sculpture, a large, inflated body whorl, a short siphonal canal and the lack of a sinus.

Fossils of Lusitanops gigasei were found in Pliocene strata at Kallo, Belgium; age range: 6 to 2.588 Ma.

Species
Species within the genus Lusitanops include:
 Lusitanops blanchardi (Dautzenberg & Fischer, 1896)
 Lusitanops bullioides (Sykes, 1906)
 Lusitanops cingulatus Bouchet & Warén, 1980
 Lusitanops dictyota Sysoev, 1997 
 Lusitanops expansus (Sars G.O., 1878)
 † Lusitanops gigasei Marquet 1998 
 Lusitanops hyaloides (Dautzenberg, 1925)
 Lusitanops lusitanicus (Sykes, 1906) 
 Lusitanops macrapex Bouchet & Warén, 1980
 Lusitanops sigmoideus Bouchet & Warén, 1980
Species brought into synonymy
 † Lusitanops bulbiformis Lozouet, 1999: synonym of † Pseudolusitanops bulbiformis (Lozouet, 1999) (original combination)
 Lusitanops cingulata: synonym of Lusitanops cingulatus Bouchet & Warén, 1980
 Lusitanops expansa (Sars G. O., 1878): synonym of Lusitanops expansus (Sars G. O., 1878)
 Lusitanops lusitanica [sic] : synonym of Lusitanops lusitanicus (Sykes, 1906)
 Lusitanops sigmoidea: synonym of Lusitanops sigmoideus Bouchet & Warén, 1980

References

 Nordsieck F. (1968). Die europäischen Meeres-Gehäuseschnecken (Prosobranchia). Vom Eismeer bis Kapverden und Mittelmeer. Gustav Fischer, Stuttgart VIII + 273 pp:

External links
 
 Worldwide Mollusc Species Data Base: Raphitomidae
 Bouchet, P.; Kantor, Y. I.; Sysoev, A.; Puillandre, N. (2011). A new operational classification of the Conoidea (Gastropoda). Journal of Molluscan Studies. 77(3): 273-308
 Neave, Sheffield Airey. (1939-1996). Nomenclator Zoologicus vol. 1-10 Online

 
Raphitomidae
Gastropod genera